Sansac may refer to:
 Places
 Sansac-Veinazès, a commune in Cantal department, south-central France
 Sansac-de-Marmiesse, a commune in Cantal department, south-central France
 Chateau of Sansac, in Beaulieu-sur-Sonnette, a commune in Charente department, southwestern France
 People
  ( - 1591), French Roman Catholic archbishop
 Jean Baptiste, marquis de Traversay (Jean-Baptiste Prevost de Sansac de Traversay, 1754-1831), French naval officer
 Louis Prévost de Sansac (1496-1576), French nobleman and soldier

See also